Park Young-seok (: November 2, 1963 – October 2011 on Annapurna) was a South Korean mountaineer.

In May 2005, he became the first person in the world to complete a True Explorers Grand Slam. He climbed the world's 14 eight-thousanders, the Seven Summits, and trekked to both poles. He holds the world's fourth fastest time (behind Nirmal Purja of Nepal, Kim Chang-ho of South Korea, and Jerzy Kukuczka of Poland) for ascending the 14 eight-thousanders, he climbed six of the 8,000-meter Himalayan peaks within one year, and gained another record for reaching the South Pole on foot in 44 days, self-sufficient and without any food re-supplies.

Achievements

Disappearance
Park and his other team members went missing after their last communications on October 18, 2011 while attempting a new route on Annapurna. Park Young-seok, Shin Dong-min, and Gang Gi-seok decided to abort the climb at around 6400 meters due to heavy rock fall and went missing during the descent. Despite a dangerous and daring rescue operation to find the missing climbers, no signs of Park, Shin or Gang were found. The Korean Alpine Federation called off the rescue operation for Park and his team at 12:00 on October 28, 2011.

See also 
 List of 20th-century summiters of Mount Everest
 List of climbers and mountaineers
 List of Mount Everest summiters by number of times to the summit
 Mountaineering

References

External links 
  
 Park Young-Seok summits Everest from Tibet – then traverses to the South side! (mounteverest.net)
 Mr. Park completes the Grand Slam (everestnews.com) May 1, 2005
 Arctic wrap-up: Tension increasing in Russia, Korean Park starting from Canada
 Breaking News: Park Young-seok (aka Mr. Park) has just became the first person to complete the GRAND SLAM! (adventuregrandslam.com)
 The North Face – Athletes – Park Young Seok

1963 births
2010s missing person cases
2011 deaths
South Korean mountain climbers
South Korean summiters of Mount Everest
Summiters of the Seven Summits
Summiters of all 14 eight-thousanders
Mountaineering deaths
Lost explorers
Dongguk University alumni
South Korean Buddhists